Non-epileptic seizures (NES), also known as non-epileptic events, are paroxysmal events that appear similar to an epileptic seizure but do not involve abnormal, rhythmic discharges of neurons in the brain. Symptoms include shaking, loss of consciousness, and loss of bladder control.
Some people have symptoms like those epileptic seizures. But non-epileptic seizures do not involve any unusual electrical activity in the brain. They usually relate to psychological, neurological, or physical trauma. It may take time to diagnose. NES are real, and people who are suffering do not have conscious and voluntary control over them.  Non-epileptic seizures are similar to epileptic seizures external, even though their cause is very dissimilar. Non-epileptic seizures may look like generalized convulsions similar to grand mal epileptic seizures. People with NES sometimes need to make some life adjustments. Seizures may affect a person’s daily activities like the ability to work and drive vehicles. Some people are confused about their condition.

They may or may not be caused by either physiological or psychological conditions. Physiological causes include fainting, sleep disorders, and heart arrhythmias. Psychological causes are known as psychogenic non-epileptic seizures. Diagnosis may be based on the history of the event and physical examination with support from heart testing and an EEG.

Terminology
The International League Against Epilepsy (ILAE) define an epileptic seizure as "a transient occurrence of signs and/or symptoms due to abnormal excessive or synchronous neuronal activity in the brain." Convulsive or non-convulsive seizures can occur in someone who does not have epilepsy – as a consequence of head injury, drug overdose, toxins, eclampsia or febrile convulsions. A provoked (or an un-provoked, or an idiopathic) seizure must generally occur twice before a person is diagnosed with epilepsy.

When used on its own, the term seizure usually refers to an epileptic seizure. The lay use of this word can also include sudden attacks of illness, loss of control, spasm or stroke. Where the physician is uncertain as to the diagnosis, the medical term paroxysmal event and the lay terms spells, funny turns or attacks may be used.

Signs and symptoms

NES symptoms are similar to those of generalized epileptic seizures. This may include:

Convulsions
Crying out or making a noise
Stiffening
Jerky, rhythmic or twitching motions
Falling down
Loss of consciousness
Confusion after returning to consciousness
Loss of bladder control
Biting the tongue

NES have some additional symptoms similar to partial seizures. These symptoms may include:

Jerky or rhythmic movements
Sensations such as tingling, dizziness, and feeling full in the stomach
Repetitive motions
Staring
Confusion
Changes in emotions
Altered senses

Causes
Possible causes include:
Syncope (fainting)
Reflex anoxic seizures
Breath-holding spells of childhood
Cataplexy
Hyperekplexia, also called startle syndrome
Migraine
Narcolepsy
Non-epileptic myoclonus
Opsoclonus
Parasomnias, including night terrors
Paroxysmal kinesigenic dyskinesia
Repetitive or ritualistic behaviours
Tics
Hypoglycemia

Type
Depending upon the source of seizures, NES can be categorized into three types.

*Epileptic Seizures- Though NES and epileptic seizures share common symptoms, they are not the same. The cause behind Epileptic seizures is an electrical interruption in the brain, when it occurs it distorted the transmission between brain cells. People may acquire epilepsy due to brain damage, head trauma, and some infectious diseases. Whereas NES do not include electrical interruptions in the brain. NES usually occurs due to psychological, neurological, or physical problems.

*Psychogenic Nonepileptic Seizures (PNES)-Psychogenic nonepileptic seizure (PNES) involves incidents that seem like epileptic seizures. But it does not cause by abnormal electrical activity in your brain. Instead, the seizures are a physical reaction to underlying psychological distress. The differential diagnosis for PNES is conversion disorder. Conversion disorder is also known as functional neurological symptom disorder. People with PNES have no conscious or voluntary control over them. PNES has been referred to as pseudo seizures in the past. The term “pseudo” had been used to define that the person is pretending to have a seizure but has not actually had a seizure, but this is not the scenario. This is the reason the preferred term is psychogenic nonepileptic seizures (PNES). It has been referred to as conversion disorder because the person is unaware of what is happening and is not consciously pretending to have a seizure.

Though there is a difference between PNES and epileptic seizure, their symptoms can be comparable. Symptoms may include:  
Sudden non-responsive 
Shaking movements
Pelvic thrusting 
Shaking movements
Shaking the head from side to side
Clenching the mouth and closing the eyes 
physiologic nonepileptic events 
Staring spells
Thrashing wildly
Stuttering
Shouting Phrases
Being startled by loud noise or other stimuli
Lack of drowsiness after an episode

*Physiologic Nonepileptic Events- There are various conditions that can cause Physiologic nonepileptic seizures. The conditions may include, sudden changes in the blood supply to the brain or in the sugar or oxygen levels in the brain. These include changes in heart rhythm, syncopal episodes, or hypoglycemia. Other physical conditions, such as sleep disorders and movement disorders, may have symptoms or episodes associated with them that can look like seizures.

Diagnosis

A wide array of phenomena may or may not resemble epileptic seizures, which may lead to people who do not have epilepsy being misdiagnosed. Indeed, a significant percentage of people initially diagnosed with epilepsy will later heal. In one study, the majority of children referred to a secondary clinic with "fits, faints and funny turns" did not have epilepsy, with syncope (fainting) as the most common alternative. In another study, 39% of children referred to a tertiary epilepsy centre did not have epilepsy, with staring episodes in mentally challenged children as the most common alternative. In adults, the figures are similar, with one study reporting a 26% rate of misdiagnosis.

Differentiation of a non-epileptic attack from an epileptic seizure includes the patient keeping their eyes closed and rarely causing themselves harm (both more common in non-epileptic attacks)

The most useful test in confirming epilepsy is an electroencephalogram (EEG). Different types of epilepsy can be identified with these patterns. A patient with NES will not show unusual electrical activity in the brain on the EEG. If the doctor suspects NES the patient will be referred to a psychologist for further diagnosis and treatment.

If any person presents with symptoms that seem to be a seizure, may be experiencing in fact an epileptic seizure. The accuracy of diagnosis is critical to a person receiving the correct treatment. 

A complete medical, neurologic, and psychiatric history
A description from any family members who may have witnessed an event
Results of prior diagnostic testing (brain imaging, bloodwork, EEG, cardiac testing)
Response to prior treatment with antileisure medications
A complete medical and neurologic examination

The standard test to help tell an epileptic seizure from a PNES is video-electroencephalography (vEEG). This test records both the outward appearance of the event on video and the electrical activity of the brain that occurs before, during and after the event.

Prognosis
After diagnosis 20 and 50% of people stop having PNES even without any specific treatment. Research showed that half of the people noticed an improvement after 3 months of psychological therapy. People with severe psychiatric symptoms face greater challenges. A person only has a brief history of PNES will stop after diagnosis.

Treatment
Psychotherapy is the most common treatment for NES. NES does not respond to anti-seizure medications. However, medications for depression or anxiety may be used as part of the treatment plan. cognitive behavioral therapy is the most useful treatment in NES.  It examines the connection between a person's thoughts and feelings and behaviors. CBT and other psychotherapies take several months to work. It is important that the patient continue their treatment plan during this time.

References

External links
What are Non-Epileptic Seizures? from Cleveland Clinic

Seizure types